One of the first shark species to be protected was the grey nurse shark (Carcharias taurus). The biology, distribution and conservation of this species are dealt with in the following paragraphs with a main focus on Australia as it was here it first became protected.

Biology

The grey nurse shark, Carcharias taurus, also called the ragged-tooth shark, is an elasmobranch and belongs to the odontaspididae (ragged-tooth) shark family. It can easily be recognized by its characteristic conical snout and under hung jaw. Both jaws are laden with sharp, long and pointed teeth. The head is flattened and it has a large and stout body, which ranges up to 3.2 m and may weigh up to 300 kg. The body is grey to grey-brown dorsally and off-white on the belly. The juveniles (young sharks) usually have dark spots on the upper two-thirds of the body. The first and second dorsal fins are of similar size and the caudal fin is asymmetric. Once believed to be a man-eater, it is now known that this shark rarely attacks humans and if it does it is only in defense, or if it is baited.
 
Sharks are the top predators in our oceans, and as such they are important for the marine ecosystems as important regulators of other species. They eat the weak, the old and the dead animals. The grey nurse sharks eat mainly lobsters, crabs, smaller sharks, fish, rays and squid.

Distribution

Grey nurse sharks live near the coast in sub-tropical to cool-temperate waters near most continental land masses (not found in the eastern Pacific Ocean off North and South America). They have a preference for some places resulting in an uneven distribution. For example, there are few grey nurse sharks found in north Australia while they are relatively abundant in the southern part of the eastern and western Australian waters. 
 
They are usually found swimming slowly, just above the sea floor, in sandy-bottomed gutters or in rocky underwater caves near inshore rocky reefs and islands. They can be found at depths ranging from 10 m (near the coastline) to 200 m (on the continental shelf). They are generally solitary but at times small schools of grey nurse sharks are found swimming and feeding together.

Conservation status in Australia
The grey nurse shark is one of the most critically endangered shark species and believed to be the first protected shark in the world. It was declared 'vulnerable' in the waters of New South Wales (Australia) in 1984 and later throughout the world.
In 1996 the species was listed globally 'vulnerable' by the International Union for Conservation of Nature (IUCN) and declared 'vulnerable' in Commonwealth waters of Australia. According to the Environment Protection and Biodiversity Conservation Act 1999 (EPBC Act 1999) it is believed that there are two separate populations of Grey nurse shark in Australia. The population in the east coast is listed as 'critically endangered' whereas the west coast population is listed as 'vulnerable' under the EPBC Act (1999)
The grey nurse sharks are also protected under the Fisheries Legislation in New South Wales, Western Australia, Victoria, Tasmania and Queensland. In the Northern Territory the species is classified as 'data deficient' by the Territory Parks and Wildlife Conservation Act (2000)NTG.

Current status
The population has declined dramatically in recent decades, especially in the 1960s and 1970s. After 20 years of protection the population is still declining and there are approximately 1000-1500 grey nurse sharks left in Eastern Australia.

Causes for decline

Every year, millions of sharks are killed by driftnets, by-catch, revenge actions, beach protective shark meshing, commercial-, recreational- and spear-fishing. The main risk is from by-catch of indirect methods of line fishing and particularly bottom-set commercial fishing lines targeting wobbegong sharks.
The grey nurse sharks are particularly vulnerable to these threats due to their late maturation and low breeding success. They reach sexual maturity at the age of three months and give birth to one or two young every second year; thus, the population grows very slowly. Furthermore, their limited distribution and specific habitats make it difficult for them to migrate to other areas. Beach nets cause the death of hundreds of shark that are caught in the nets and cannot escape.  This also occurs in trawling and fishing nets. Another threat for the sharks is finning.

Conservation efforts

The increased public awareness has led to the development of methods that reduce the unintentional killing of elasmobranch (sharks and rays), turtles and marine mammals. An inexpensive method to reduce by-catch is by using tunnel excluders. These enable sharks, turtles and rays to escape and survive. A prototype used by the Dutch achieved a 40-100% reduction of the by-catch of the most vulnerable species.
  
The size and texture of nets are also of great importance for the survival of larger vulnerable species. Often smaller nets have been shown to catch the same amount of target fish and reduce the by-catch greatly, especially of the mature sharks. 
 
Foundation of protected marine areas is particularly valuable for protecting sharks and a new method, taggingCSIRO, can reveal their preferred forage and breeding areas. A good example of managed marine areas is to be found in Jervis Bay, NSW. Jervis Bay has been divided into  time zones, some for fishing and some for diving, and the strategy has been approved by both fishermen and divers. However, “Divers that regularly dive at places like South West Rocks in New South Wales will tell you that up to 70 per cent of the sharks there are trailing hooks from line fishing.” says Nicola Beynon from the Humane Society International (HSI). 
Another widely used method for preserving sharks is eco-tourism such as scuba diving, cage-diving and feeding of sharks. However, it is crucial that this is strictly managed, and that the sharks' behaviour is monitored. Feeding and touching of marine animals should be strictly discouraged since it can alter their behaviour, and result in long lasting and severe stress to the animals. Divers have noticed sharks altering their behaviour due to increased hierarchy behaviour around killing areas. The lowest in the hierarchy become stressed and exhibit unpredictable behaviour, which could result in attacks on humans.

References

Further reading

Otway, N.M, Burke, A.L., Morrison, N.S. and Parker, P.C. (2003 ) "Monitoring and identification of NSW Critical Habitat Sites for conservation of Grey Nurse Sharks." NSW Fisheries Final Report Series, No. 47.

Boissonneault, M-F. (2009) Nurse or Nemesis? Public Perception of the Australian Grey Nurse Shark. Mandurah, WA:Equilibrium Books.

External links
Grey Nurse Shark at the Australian Department of Sustainability, Environment, Water, Population and Communities

Shark conservation